The 2003 Nigerian Senate election in Benue State was held on April 12, 2003, to elect members of the Nigerian Senate to represent Benue State. David Mark representing Benue South and Joshua Adagba representing Benue North-West won on the platform of the Peoples Democratic Party, while Daniel Saror representing Benue North-East won on the platform of the All Nigeria Peoples Party.

Overview

Summary

Results

Benue South 
The election was won by David Mark of the Peoples Democratic Party.

Benue North-West 
The election was won by Joshua Adagba of the Peoples Democratic Party.

Benue North-East 
The election was won by Daniel Saror of the All Nigeria Peoples Party.

References 

April 2003 events in Nigeria
Benue State Senate elections
Ben